Duno is a comune (municipality) in the Province of Varese in the Italian region Lombardy, located about  northwest of Milan and about  northwest of Varese. 
Duno borders the following municipalities: Brissago-Valtravaglia, Casalzuigno, Cassano Valcuvia, Cuveglio, Mesenzana, Porto Valtravaglia.

References

Cities and towns in Lombardy